King Ling College is an aided secondary school founded by the King Ling Foundation for Education and Culture in September 1994 in Tseung Kwan O, Hong Kong.

School Mission 
To foster Chinese culture and civic awareness while emphasizing the five areas of moral, intellectual, physical, social and aesthetic development of students so as to nurture them to be knowledgeable, cultured, committed and highly ethical learners.

School information
The school enjoys a full house of teachers professionally trained, with 80% received a master's degree or higher academic qualifications (2015). Awards include National Geographic Think Great Awards (2008), and Odyssey of the Mind(regional: 2004, 2005, 2007, 2008, 2010, 2015, 2016; world finals: 2007, 2010, 2016).

It is one of the first schools to teach Chinese classes in putonghua in Hong Kong.  It provides education for students in Chinese, English, Mathematics, Science, Arts, Physical, technology, and personal, social and humanities education.  Under the leadership of Dr.Anson Yang, whose expertise is in English and curriculum and instruction, the school will continue to emphasize the learning of Chinese culture with additional attention to English medium of instruction.

There are over 40 extra curricula activity groups within the school, which can be divided into five categories that includes academic, sports, interests, music and social services.

School facilities 
For basic school facilities, the school has a roof garden, a 1200-seat auditorium, and a 600-seat canteen. Every classroom has air conditioning and liquid-crystal projector installed.

For sports, the school has an in-door swimming pool, two basketball courts, one handball court, five badminton courts and a football court.

Senior Secondary Curriculum
The senior secondary subjects include Biology, Business, Accounting and Financial Studies, Chemistry, Chinese, Chinese history, Chinese literature, Economics, English, Geography, History, Information and Communication Technology, Liberal studies, Mathematics, Physical Education and Physics.  Students in senior secondary one will be allowed to choose two to three electives.

See also
Education in Hong Kong
List of secondary schools in Hong Kong

References

External links

Official site

Secondary schools in Hong Kong
Tseung Kwan O
Educational institutions established in 1994
1994 establishments in Hong Kong